The annual Miss Mexico pageant, was held at Boca del Rio, Veracruz, on September 29, 1990. Thirty-two contestants competed for the national title, which was won by Lupita Jones from Baja California, who later competed in Miss Universe 1991 where she was winner. Jones was crowned by outgoing Miss Mexico 1989 titleholder Marilé del Rosario Santiago.

Placements Miss México

Contestants

Contestants Notes

 Luz María Mena Bassó was selected to compete in Miss World 1990

Beauty pageants in Mexico
1990 beauty pageants
1990 in Mexico